Robert Michael Picciolo (February 4, 1953 – January 3, 2018) was a Major League Baseball player and coach.

Playing career
Picciolo played nine seasons in the major leagues, from 1977–85, for the Oakland Athletics, Milwaukee Brewers, and California Angels, where he was primarily a shortstop, although he also played at third base and second base. 

In 1,628 major league at bats, he walked only 25 times. Picciolo spent 20 years in the San Diego Padres organization after a nine-year big league career playing for the Athletics, Brewers, and Angels.

Post-playing career

He was a minor league manager with the Class-A Short Season Spokane Indians in the Northwest League in 1986 and 1987, winning the League and Division titles in his second season there, then was a roving infield instructor the following two years before being promoted to the Padres big league coaching staff midway through the 1990 season.

There, he served under Padres managers Greg Riddoch, Jim Riggleman and Bruce Bochy as a first base coach (mid-1990-92), a bench coach (1993–2002) and third base coach (2003–05).

From 2006 to 2010, he served as the Angels' roving infield instructor. He was then named the Angels' bench coach for manager Mike Scioscia on November 10, 2010.

He was fired by the Angels on October 8, 2013.

Personal life
Picciolo graduated from Westchester High School in 1971, earned a bachelor's degree in journalism and played one season of baseball in Pepperdine University. He earned All-District honors and helped Pepperdine to first place in the WCC and a spot in the NCAA District Playoffs.  Picciolo died on January 3, 2018, aged 64, from a heart attack. 

He was survived by his wife Debbie and two sons, Breton and Dustin, who both attended Pepperdine University in Malibu, California. Breton was a former staffer in the Padres communications department.

References

External links

, or Retrosheet,

1953 births
2018 deaths
American expatriate baseball players in Canada
American people of Italian descent
Baseball players from Santa Monica, California
Birmingham A's players
California Angels players
Los Angeles Angels of Anaheim coaches
Major League Baseball bench coaches
Major League Baseball shortstops
Milwaukee Brewers players
Minor league baseball managers
Oakland Athletics players
Pepperdine University alumni
Pepperdine Waves baseball players
San Diego Padres coaches
San Jose Missions players
Santa Monica College alumni
Santa Monica Corsairs baseball players
Spokane Indians managers
Tigres de Aragua players
American expatriate baseball players in Venezuela
Tucson Toros players
Vancouver Canadians players
Westchester High School (Los Angeles) alumni